The 1997 World Short Track Speed Skating Team Championships was the 7th edition of the World Short Track Speed Skating Team Championships which took place on 4–6 April 1997 in Seoul, South Korea. The qualifying competition took place on 4 April 1997 for 7 nations in the men's event and 6 nations in the women's event. Three best nations qualified for the final event.

Medal winners

Results

Men

Women

External links
Results
 Results in ISU's database
 Results book

World Short Track Speed Skating Team Championships
1997 World Short Track Speed Skating Team Championships